Wenyu Shen (pinyin: shěn wén'yù) (born 13 October 1986, in Chongqing) is a Chinese pianist.

External links
 http://www.wenyushen.com/

1986 births
Living people
Chinese classical pianists
Prize-winners of the Queen Elisabeth Competition
Musicians from Chongqing
21st-century classical pianists